Prof. Dr. med. Wolfgang Grodd (born 25 July 1942 in Detmold) is a German neuroradiologist and professor emeritus of the University hospital at the University of Tübingen. He is known for his scientific works on the development and application of structural and functional magnetic resonance imaging in metabolic diseases, sensorimotor representation, language production, and cognitive processing, cerebellum, thalamus, and basal ganglia. Currently, Wolfgang Grodd is a research scientist at the Department of the High-Field MR at the Max Planck Institute for Biological Cybernetics.

Biography
After serving as a temporary soldier in the German Army from 1959 to 1964 and training as an electronics technician, W. Grodd obtained his Abitur (high school diploma) in 1968 at Westfalen Kolleg in Bielefeld and studied biology from 1968 to 1977 and medicine from 1974 to 1981 at the University of Tübingen. From 1972 to 1975 he was a scholarship holder of the Protestant Student Union Villigst. He received his diploma in biology in 1977 and his license to practice medicine in 1981. This was followed by residency training as a radiologist at the Medical Radiation Institute of the University of Tübingen (1981-1986), which was interrupted by a DFG research fellowship at the Department of Radiology at the University of San Francisco from 1984 to 1985.

In 1987, he initially moved to the Department of Neuroradiology at the University of Tübingen as a consultant, where he worked as a senior physician from 1991 to 1995. In 1991, he habilitated in the field of radiology/neuroradiology on the topic of experimental and clinical investigations of volume-selective proton spectroscopy of the human brain, and in the same year he was granted a teaching license in the field of neuroradiology. The following year, W. Grodd was appointed Professor of Neuroradiology at the Steglitz Clinic of the Free University of Berlin, but declined. From 1995, he was professor and head of the scientific section Experimental Nuclear Magnetic Resonance of the Central Nervous System at the University Hospital of Tübingen, where he gave his farewell lecture in 2010. Currently, Grodd is at the Department High-field Magnetic Resonance at the Max Planck Institute for Biological Cybernetics.

Scientific focus
 Clinical use of proton spectroscopy
 Maturation, abnormalities and metabolic diseases of children's brains
 Functional imaging of fear, sociopathy, humour and laughing
 Memory performance in Alzheimer's disease and dementia
 Language processing and speech production
 Functional anatomy of cerebellum and thalamus Using functional magnetic resonance imaging (fMRI), Grodd was able to demonstrate somatotopic activation areas for the motor activities of lips, tongue, hands and feet in the cortex of the cerebellum.
 Cognitive processing of visual processes

Awards
For his scientific research activity, Grodd was awarded the "Kurt-Decker Award" of the German Society for Neuroradiology in 1988, 1989, 1992 and in 1998. In 1989 the German Society for Neurotraumatology honored him for his outstanding scientific work.

Memberships in scientific organizations
Grodd is a member of various national and international scientific organizations:
 since 1988  International Society of Magnetic Resonance in Medicine(ISMRM)
 since 1988  European Society of Magnetic Resonance in Medicine and Biology (ESMRMB)
 since 1996  Organization for Human Brain Mapping(OHBM)
 since 1998  American Society of Advancement of Science(AAAS)
 since 2000  German Society of Clinical Neurophysiology(DGKN)
 since 2001  Society for Neuroscience(SNS)

Publications
Grodd is the author and co-author of more than 250 publications in neuroscientific journals and 26 chapters in monographs and books.
 list of publications Wolfgang Grodd, ResearchGate
 list of publications Wolfgang Grodd, PubMed

References

External links
 MPG Tübingen Wolfgang Grodd

Living people
People from Detmold
1942 births
German radiologists